Charles Vernon Gridley (24 November 1844 – 5 June 1898) was a captain in the United States Navy during the American Civil War and the Spanish–American War.

Early life
Gridley descended from Thomas Gridley (1612–1653), who emigrated from England to New England in 1633. He was born to Frank and Ann Eliza (Sholes) Gridley in Logansport, Indiana, on 24 November 1844. His parents moved to Hillsdale, Michigan, when he was three months old.

Naval career

Early life and career
After attending Hillsdale College, Gridley was appointed to the United States Naval Academy in 1860. He reported for duty with his class in September 1863, joining the sloop-of-war  with the West Gulf Blockading Squadron. He distinguished himself with David Farragut at the Battle of Mobile Bay on 5 August 1864.

Gridley was promoted to lieutenant in 1867 and lieutenant commander on March 12, 1868. While stationed in Erie, he married Harriet, the daughter of Judge John P. Vincent and had three children. Harriet was also a cousin of Civil War hero Brigadier General Strong Vincent. Gridley was promoted to commander in 1882. He also served a tour as instructor at the Naval Academy and another with the Cruiser Training Squadron.

Battle of Manila Bay
During the Battle of Manila Bay on 1 May 1898, Gridley commanded the Olympia from inside the vessel's armored conning tower, an uncomfortably hot station in the Philippine sun. Dewey gave his famous command, "You may fire when you are ready, Gridley". At the conclusion of the battle, Gridley was not in a condition to celebrate, suffering from dysentery and what appears to have been liver cancer. The heat and stress of the conning tower further weakened him. Dewey would have relieved him of command had not Gridley protested.

Last days
Several weeks later, he was sent home. On May 25, Gridley was to begin his journey home. One crewman recorded the event as follows:
He came up out of his cabin dressed in civilian clothes and was met by the rear admiral [[[George Dewey|Dewey]]] who extended him a most cordial hand. A look of troubled disappointment flitted across the captain's brow, but vanished when he stepped to the head of the gangway and, looking, over saw, not the launch, but a twelve-oared cutter manned entirely by officers of the Olympia. There were men in the boat who had not pulled a stroke for a quarter of a century. Old Glory was at the stern and a captain's silken coach-whip at the bow; and when Captain Gridley, beloved alike by officers and men, entered the boat, it was up oars, and all that, just as though they were common sailors who were to row him over to the Zafiro. When he sat down upon the handsome boat-cloth that was spread for him, he bowed his head, and his hands hid his face as First-Lieutenant Reese, acting coxswain, ordered, 'Shove off; out oars; give away!' Later in the day the lookout on the bridge reported, ' Zafiro under way sir,' and the deck officer passed on the word until a little twitter from Pat Murray's pipe brought all the other bo's'ns around him, and in concert they sang out, 'Stand by to man the rigging!' Not the Olympia alone, but every other ship in the squadron dressed and manned, and the last we ever saw of our dear captain he was sitting on a chair out on the Zafiro 's quarter-deck, apparently listening to the [Olympia's] old band play.

Gridley was physically spent, and his health began to sink even faster once he was finally released from the strain of command. He was transferred from the Zafiro to the commercial steamer Coptic on May 27, but he had to be taken aboard on a stretcher. He knew that his condition was grave and wrote simply, "I think I am done for it, personally."

Death and burial
Aboard the Coptic, on June 5, 1898, Gridley died while the vessel was in Kobe, Japan.

His body was cremated and sent home. Services were held in Erie, Pennsylvania's Cathedral of St. Paul. He was buried in Erie's Lakeside Cemetery.

Gridley was a member of the Empire State Society of the Sons of the American Revolution.

Legacy

Four ships in the United States Navy have been named for him.

A monument to Gridley was erected in Erie and placed in the center of a city park, which was named Gridley Park.

A seashell is depicted on the coat-of-arms of Gridley's original alma mater, Hillsdale College, in honor of his heroism at the Battle of Manila Bay.

See also

USS Olympia (C-6)
George Dewey
Battle of Manila Bay

References

External links
 
 

1844 births
1898 deaths
Union Navy officers
United States Navy personnel of the Spanish–American War
United States Naval Academy alumni
United States Navy officers
People of Michigan in the American Civil War
People from Logansport, Indiana
American people of English descent
Hillsdale College alumni
Deaths in Japan
Sons of the American Revolution